Vriend is a Dutch surname meaning "friend". Notable people with the surname include:

Ann Vriend, Canadian singer-songwriter and pianist
Bep Vriend (born 1946), Dutch contract bridge player
Cor Vriend (born 1949), Dutch long-distance runner
Delwin Vriend (born 1966), Canadian activist
Harry Vriend (born 1938), Dutch water polo player
Jan Vriend (born 1938), Dutch composer, conductor and pianist
Wim Vriend (born 1941), Dutch water polo player

See also
Vriend v. Alberta, Supreme Court of Canada case

Dutch-language surnames